Georg Hund von Wenkheim, or Georg Hundt von Wenkheim (c. 1520 - June 17, 1572) was the 40th Grandmaster of the Teutonic Knights, reigning from 1566 to his death 1572.

Biography 
Georg Hund was born in Wenkheim in Franconia.

By 1544, he had become a member of the Teutonic Order. He served in the city of Heilbronn until 1553, when he became Komtur of Weißenburg. In 1558, he became Komtur of Frankurt.

In 1566, Georg was appointed Grandmaster of the Teutonic Knights by Holy Roman Emperor Maximilian II at Augsburg. As Grandmaster, he served as an advisor to Maximilian II and serviced the Hapsburg Family. He also organized diplomatic missions for Anna of Austria, the future wife of King Phillip II of Spain (who he was also in the service of), including a 1570 mission where Georg escorted her to Spain.

During his reign in 1568, Albert, Duke of Prussia, who was the 36th Grandmaster of the Teutonic Order that had secularized the order's territorial possessions in Prussia, died. Georg attempted to capitalize on his death as a way of reannexing Prussia for the Teutonic Knights. However, since Albert in his process of secularizing Prussia had made the duchy a Polish vassal, both the order and the Holy Roman Empire objected out of fear of starting a military conflict with Poland. As such, his wishes were largely futile, aside from being granted fiefdom rights in Prussia.

Within the order, he promoted greater unity and discipline, and attempting to remove pro-Reformation knights within the order. As a supporter of the Catholic counter-reformation, he attempted to follow the doctrine established with the 1545 - 1563 Council of Trent.

Georg Hund died on June 17, 1572. He was buried in the Teutonic Church at the Mergentheim Palace, the seat of the Teutonic Grandmaster that he spent much of his reign expanding.

References 

1572 deaths
Grand Masters of the Teutonic Order
1520 births